The New English Bible (NEB) is an English translation of the Bible. The New Testament was published in 1961 and the Old Testament (with the Apocrypha) was published on 16 March 1970. In 1989, it was significantly revised and republished as the Revised English Bible.

Background
Near the time when the copyright to the English Revised Version was due to expire (1935), the Oxford University Press (OUP), and the Cambridge University Press (CUP), who were the current English Revised Version copyright holders, began investigations to determine whether a modern revision of the English Revised Version text was necessary. In May 1946 G. S. Hendry, along with the Presbytery of Stirling and Dunblane produced a notice, which was presented to the General Assembly of the Church of Scotland, indicating that the work of translating should be undertaken in order to produce a Bible with thoroughly "modern English." After the work of delegation was finished, a general conference was held in October 1946 where it was determined that a completely fresh translation should be undertaken rather than a revision as originally suggested by the University Presses of Oxford and Cambridge.

Translation
In due time, three committees of translators and one committee of literary advisers were enlisted and charged with the task of producing the New English Bible. Each of the three translation committees was responsible for a different section of the Bible. These three sections consisted of the Old Testament, the Apocrypha, and the New Testament.

The work of translating was typically undertaken in this fashion: A member, or members, of one of the committees would produce a draft of a book, or books, of the Bible (typically from the section in which they were assigned) and submit the draft to the section committee. Occasionally a scholar outside the committee would be invited to participate in this phase of the translation process and was asked to submit a draft of the book or books with which he or she had renowned experience. This draft was then distributed among the members of the appropriate committee. Members of the committee would then meet and discuss the translation choices made in the draft. The draft that resulted from this meeting of the concerned committee was then sent to the committee of literary advisers, who would revise the draft in co-operation with the translators. When a consensus on the draft was reached, the final draft would be sent on to the Joint Committee, which was head over the four sub-committees.

For the Old Testament the translators primarily made use of the Masoretic Text as presented by Rudolf Kittel in his 3rd Edition of the Biblia Hebraica (1937). In addition to the Masoretic Text, the translators also made use of the Dead Sea Scrolls, the Samaritan Pentateuch, the Greek Septuagint, the Aramaic Targums, and the Syriac Peshitta.

For the Apocrypha the translators made the decision to follow The Old Testament in Greek according to the Septuagint, edited by Henry Barclay Swete. Also, the translators made use of the Codex Sinaiticus (for the Book of Tobit), Theodotion's translation of the Apocrypha (for The Song of the Three, Daniel and Susanna, and Daniel, Bel and the Snake (sometimes referred to as the Dragon)), Codex Vaticanus Graecus 1209 (for Sirach), Codex 248 (also for Sirach), and Robert Lubbock Bensly's Latin text The Fourth Book of Ezra for 2 Esdras.

For the New Testament the New English Bible Translators relied on a large body of texts including early Greek New Testament manuscripts, early translations rendered in other languages (those aside from Greek), and the quotations of early Christian writers and speakers. The text adhered to by the translators of the New English Bible can be found in The Greek New Testament, edited by R.V.G. Tasker and published by the University Presses of Oxford and Cambridge (1964).

Form
The translators of the New English Bible chose to render their translation using a principle of translation called dynamic equivalence (also referred to as functional equivalence or thought-for-thought translation). C. H. Dodd, Vice-chairman and Director of the Joint Committee, commented that the translators "...conceived our task to be that of understanding the original as precisely as we could... and then saying again in our own native idiom what we believed the author to be saying in his."

This method of translation is in contrast to the traditional translations of the Authorized Version (King James Version), English Revised Version, American Standard Version, Revised Standard Version, and others, which place an emphasis on word-for-word correspondence between the source and target language. Dodd goes on to summarize the translation of the New English Bible as "...free, it may be, rather than literal, but a faithful translation nevertheless, so far as we could compass it."

As a result, the New English Bible is necessarily more paraphrastic at times in order to render the thoughts of the original author into modern English.

Reception
Because of its scholarly translators, the New English Bible has been considered one of the more important translations of the Bible to be produced following the Second World War. Biblical scholar F. F. Bruce declared that "To the sponsors and translators of the New English Bible the English speaking world owes an immense debt. They have given us a version which is contemporary in idiom, up-to-date in scholarship, attractive, and at times exciting in content..." T. S. Eliot, however, commented that the New English Bible "astonishes in its combination of the vulgar, the trivial and the pedantic." Henry Gifford argued that "the new translators … kill the wonder".

The New English Bible was produced primarily by British and European scholarship (for example, Whitsuntide is rendered in 1 Corinthians 16:8 rather than Pentecost). However, directly following the Second World War the English of the United Kingdom and Europe began to be influenced by foreign idiom, especially that of the Americans. For this reason, passages found in the New English Bible could be understood by a large body of English speaking individuals. The British publisher and author Adam Nicolson, in his 2003 book on the King James Bible, criticized the newer translation for its 'anxiety not to bore or intimidate'.

In relation to the issue of gender inclusiveness, the New English Bible was produced before a time when gender-inclusive language was introduced into Bible translations. It rendered pronouns (among other particles) using the traditional literary method followed by many previous translations in which the generic use of "he" is translated faithfully from the original manuscripts. However, using this traditional literary method has become recently controversial, among some Christian circles, and a revision of the New English Bible titled the Revised English Bible was undertaken that included gender-inclusive language.

The NEB with the Apocrypha is one of the versions authorized to be used in services of the Episcopal Church.

Contributors and sponsors
Baptist Union of Great Britain and Ireland
British and Foreign Bible Society
Church of England
Church of Scotland
Congregational Church in England and Wales
Council of Churches for Wales
Irish Council of Churches
London Yearly Meeting of the Religious Society of Friends
Methodist Church of Great Britain
National Bible Society of Scotland
Presbyterian Church of England

Members of the committees

Chairman of the Joint Committee responsible for translation
The Most Rev Donald Coggan, Archbishop of York (1961–1974).

Old Testament committee
W. D. McHardy, B. J. Roberts, A. R. Johnson, John Adney Emerton, C. A. Simpson, Sir Godfrey Driver (convener), L. H. Brockington, N. H. Snaith, N. W. Porteous, H. H. Rowley, C. H. Dodd (ex officio), P. P. Allen (secretary).

Apocrypha committee
Prof W.D. McHardy (Convener), Prof W. Barclay, Prof W.H. Cadman, Dr G.D. Caird, Prof C.F.D. Moule, Prof J.R. Porter, G.M. Styler.

New Testament Committee
Prof C.H. Dodd (Convener), Dr G.S. Duncan, Dr W.F. Howard, Prof G.D. Kilpatrick, Prof T.W. Manson, Prof C.F.D. Moule, J.A.T. Robinson, G.M. Styler, Prof R.V.G. Tasker.

Literary Committee
Prof Sir Roger Mynors, Prof Basil Willey, Sir Arthur Norrington, Anne Ridler, Canon Adam Fox, Dr John Carey, and the Conveners of the Translation Panels.

Scholarly Associates
Prof G.W. Anderson, Rev Matthew Black, Prof J.Y. Campbell, J.A.F. Gregg, H. St J. Hart, Prof F.S. Marsh, Prof John Mauchline, Dr H.G. Meecham, Prof C.R. North, Prof O.S. Rankin, Dr Nigel Turner.

Publications

References

Further reading
 Carter, Cecil (1976). The New English Bible. Prince George, B.C.: C. G. Carter; [S.l.]: distr. by the Trinitarian Bible Society (Canada). N.B.: An assessment of this English version of the Bible.
 Ebor, D., (Editor) (1970). The New English Bible with the Apocrypha. Oxford University Press and Cambridge University Press.
 Lockyer (Sr.), H., (Editor), et al., (1986). Nelson's Illustrated Bible Dictionary. Nashville, TN: Thomas Nelson, Inc. 
 McManners, J., (Editor) (2001). The Oxford Illustrated History of Christianity. Great Clarendon Street, Oxford: Oxford University Press. 
 Nicolson, A., (2003). God's Secretaries: The Making of the King James Bible. New York, NY: HarperCollins Publishers.

External links
 New English Bible 1970 version edition
 Cambridge University Press: New English Bible
 Michael Marlowe on the New English Bible
 Kenneth Rexroth on the New English Bible

1970 books
Bible translations into English
1970 in Christianity